Alex Stiebling (born December 26, 1976) is a retired American professional mixed martial artist. A professional competitor from 1999 until 2009, he competed in the PRIDE Fighting Championships, WEC, King of the Cage, BodogFIGHT, the World Fighting Alliance. He won the International Vale Tudo Championship in 2001.

Early life
Stiebling grew up in Louisville, KY and graduated from Trinity High School in 1995.  As a senior, he finished as runner-up in the 160 lbs. weight class of the 1995 Kentucky high school wrestling state tournament.

Mixed martial arts career

Early career
Stiebling compiled a professional record of 5-0-1 competing in the Midwestern regional circuit before facing Mark Hughes at UFC 28 on November 17, 2000. He lost via unanimous decision, but would bounce back later winning the IVC tournament in November of the next year.

PRIDE Fighting Championships
Stiebling made his PRIDE debut at PRIDE 18 against Allan Goes on December 23, 2001. He won via third-round TKO.

He next faced another Brazilian fighter in Wallid Ismail at PRIDE 19 on February 24, 2002. He won via unanimous decision. After capturing Brazil's IVC Championship and with two straight wins over notable Brazilian fighters, Stiebling received his nickname "The Brazilian Killa."

With an impressive record of 12-1-1, Stiebling fought future UFC Middleweight Champion Anderson Silva at PRIDE 21 on June 23, 2002. He lost via TKO due to a doctor stoppage at 1:23 into the first round.

Stiebling brought his losing streak to four going into his final PRIDE appearance at PRIDE 25 against Akira Shoji on March 16, 2003. He lost via controversial split decision.

World Extreme Cagefighting
Stiebling made his WEC debut at WEC 9 on January 16, 2004 against Joe Riggs. After losing the first round due to Riggs' superior striking and ground and pound technique, Stiebling was able to get a submission victory with a triangle choke in the second round.

Stiebling picked up another second-round submission via arm triangle choke over Tim McKenzie at WEC 10, bringing his winning streak to five before losing to Antônio Rogério Nogueira via unanimous decision.

Stiebling then lost his next two WEC bouts to Chael Sonnen and Vernon White, respectively. He then fought Jason Guida at WEC 22, and won via unanimous decision.

He then faced Fernando Gonzalez at WEC 23. He lost via TKO due to a doctor stoppage in the first round.

Independent promotions
Stiebling went 1-2 in his final three fights before retiring in 2009.

Mixed martial arts record

|-
| Loss
| align=center| 19–11–1 (1)
| Murilo Rua
| TKO (head kick and punches)
| BC: Bitetti Combat 4
| 
| align=center| 1
| align=center| 0:39
| Rio de Janeiro, Brazil
| 
|-
| Loss
| align=center| 19–10–1 (1)
| Moise Rimbon
| TKO (punches)
| BodogFIGHT: Costa Rica Combat
| 
| align=center| 2
| align=center| 4:04
| Costa Rica
| 
|-
| Win
| align=center| 19–9–1 (1)
| Auggie Padeken
| Decision (unanimous)
| Extreme Wars 5: Battlegrounds
| 
| align=center| 3
| align=center| 3:00
| Honolulu, Hawaii, United States
| 
|-
| Loss
| align=center| 18–9–1 (1)
| Fernando Gonzalez
| TKO (doctor stoppage)
| WEC 23
| 
| align=center| 1
| align=center| 2:35
| Lemoore, California, United States
| 
|-
| Win
| align=center| 18–8–1 (1)
| Jason Guida
| Decision (unanimous)
| WEC 22
| 
| align=center| 3
| align=center| 5:00
| 
| 
|-
| Loss
| align=center| 17–8–1 (1)
| Vernon White
| KO (punch)
| WEC 17
| 
| align=center| 2
| align=center| 0:09
| Lemoore, California, United States
| 
|-
| Loss
| align=center| 17–7–1 (1)
| Chael Sonnen
| Decision (unanimous)
| WEC 12
| 
| align=center| 3
| align=center| 5:00
| Lemoore, California, United States
| 
|-
| Loss
| align=center| 17–6–1 (1)
| Antônio Rogério Nogueira
| Decision (unanimous)
| Gladiator FC: Day 1
| 
| align=center| 3
| align=center| 5:00
| South Korea
| 
|-
| Win
| align=center| 17–5–1 (1)
| Tim McKenzie
| Submission (arm-triangle choke)
| WEC 10 
| 
| align=center| 2
| align=center| 2:25
| Lemoore, California, United States
| 
|-
| Win
| align=center| 16–5–1 (1)
| Mikko Rupponen
| Submission (rear-naked-choke)
| FF 10: Fight Festival 10
| 
| align=center| 1
| align=center| 4:25
| Helsinki, Finland
| 
|-
| Win
| align=center| 15–5–1 (1)
| Joe Riggs
| Submission (triangle choke)
| WEC 9
| 
| align=center| 2
| align=center| 1:54
| Lemoore, California, United States
| 
|-
| Win
| align=center| 14–5–1 (1)
| Mike Rogers
| Decision (unanimous)
| RSF: Shooto Challenge 2
| 
| align=center| 2
| align=center| 5:00
| Belleville, Illinois, United States
| 
|-
| Win
| align=center| 13–5–1 (1)
| Mikko Rupponen
| Submission (choke)
| FF 8: Fight Festival 8
| 
| align=center| 2
| align=center| 5:00
| Helsinki, Finland
| 
|-
| Loss
| align=center| 12–5–1 (1)
| Akira Shoji
| Decision (split)
| PRIDE 25
| 
| align=center| 3
| align=center| 5:00
| Yokohama, Kanagawa
| 
|-
| Loss
| align=center| 12–4–1 (1)
| Marvin Eastman
| KO (punch)
| WFA 3: Level 3
| 
| align=center| 1
| align=center| 1:07
| Las Vegas, Nevada, United States
| 
|-
| Loss
| align=center| 12–3–1 (1)
| Yuki Sasaki
| Decision (unanimous)
| Pancrase: 2002 Anniversary Show
| 
| align=center| 3
| align=center| 5:00
| Yokohama, Kanagawa
| 
|-
| Loss
| align=center| 12–2–1 (1)
| Anderson Silva
| TKO (doctor stoppage)
| PRIDE 21
| 
| align=center| 1
| align=center| 1:23
| Saitama, Saitama, Japan
| 
|-
| Win
| align=center| 12–1–1 (1)
| Wallid Ismail
| Decision (unanimous)
| PRIDE 19
| 
| align=center| 3
| align=center| 5:00
| Saitama, Saitama, Japan
| 
|-
| Win
| align=center| 11–1–1 (1)
| Allan Goes
| TKO (knees and punches)
| PRIDE 18
| 
| align=center| 3
| align=center| 0:47
| Saitama, Saitama, Japan
| 
|-
| Win
| align=center| 10–1–1 (1)
| Angelo Araujo
| Submission (rear-naked choke)
| IVC 14: USA vs. Brazil
| 
| align=center| 1
| align=center| 4:01
| Caracas, Venezuela
| 
|-
| Win
| align=center| 9–1–1 (1)
| Milton Bahia
| Submission (heel hook)
| IVC 14: USA vs. Brazil
| 
| align=center| 1
| align=center| 1:07
| Caracas, Venezuela
| 
|-
| Win
| align=center| 8–1–1 (1)
| Leandro Ribeiro
| KO (kick)
| IVC 14: USA vs. Brazil
| 
| align=center| 1
| align=center| 0:05
| Caracas, Venezuela
| 
|-
| Win
| align=center| 7–1–1 (1)
| Luiz Claudio das Dores
| Submission (heel hook)
| IVC 14: USA vs. Brazil
| 
| align=center| 1
| align=center| 9:22
| Caracas, Venezuela
| 
|-
| Win
| align=center| 6–1–1 (1)
| Dennis Reed
| Submission (armbar)
| RSF 3: Reality Submission Fighting 3
| 
| align=center| 1
| align=center| 3:30
| Belleville, Illinois, United States
| 
|-
| NC
| align=center| 5–1–1 (1)
| Sanae Kikuta
| NC (accidental headbutt)
| Pancrase: Proof 1
| 
| align=center| 1
| align=center| 3:11
| Tokyo, Japan
| 
|-
| Loss
| align=center| 5–1–1
| Mark Hughes
| Decision (unanimous)
| UFC 28
| 
| align=center| 2
| align=center| 5:00
| Atlantic City, New Jersey, United States
| 
|-
| Win
| align=center| 5–0–1
| Kai Hansen
| Submission (heel hook)
| HOOKnSHOOT: Driven
| 
| align=center| 0
| align=center| 0:00
| Evansville, Indiana, United States
| 
|-
| Win
| align=center| 4–0–1
| Louis Burgette
| TKO (submission to punches)
| HOOKnSHOOT: Double Fury 1
| 
| align=center| 0
| align=center| N/A
| Evansville, Indiana, United States
| 
|-
| Win
| align=center| 3–0–1
| August Porquet
| Decision (unanimous)
| HOOKnSHOOT: Beyond
| 
| align=center| 1
| align=center| 15:00
| Evansville, Indiana, United States
| 
|-
| Win
| align=center| 2–0–1
| Roberto Ramirez
| Submission (ankle lock)
| HOOKnSHOOT: Breakout
| 
| align=center| 1
| align=center| 11:43
| Evansville, Indiana, United States
| 
|-
| Draw
| align=center| 1–0–1
| Jeremy Morrison
| Draw
| RITC 3: Rage in the Cage (Indiana) 3
| 
| align=center| 1
| align=center| 0:00
| Evansville, Indiana, United States
| 
|-
| Win
| align=center| 1–0
| Furman Long
| TKO
| WPC: Rage in the Cage
| 
| align=center| 0
| align=center| 0:00
| Evansville, Indiana, United States
|

References

External links
 
 

Living people
1976 births
American male mixed martial artists
Mixed martial artists utilizing Muay Thai
Mixed martial artists utilizing Brazilian jiu-jitsu
American practitioners of Brazilian jiu-jitsu
American Muay Thai practitioners
Sportspeople from Louisville, Kentucky
Ultimate Fighting Championship male fighters